Yoon Ji-su (or  ; born 24 January 1993) is a South Korean right-handed sabre fencer.

Yoon is a four-time team Asian champion and a two-time individual Asian champion. 

A two-time Olympian, Yoon is a 2021 team Olympic bronze medalist.

Early life 
Yoon is the younger of two children and only daughter of retired baseball player and coach Yoon Hak-kil. She was born and raised in Busan as her father was a "one-team man" who spent his entire playing career and part of his coaching career with Lotte Giants. Her father had been initially opposed to her becoming a professional athlete but relented after much persuasion.

Yoon was initially a taekwondo athlete in elementary school before switching to fencing in middle school. As a high school student, she participated in the 2010 Junior World Fencing Championships.

Career 
Yoon was first selected for the senior national team in 2011 and won individual gold at the 2012 Asian Championships. She did not participate in the 2012 Summer Olympics as the women's team sabre was not in rotation and she was not ranked high enough to be selected for the individual event. In 2014, she was part of the team along with Kim Ji-yeon, Hwang Seon-a and Lee Ra-jin and they won silver at the Asian Championships and gold at the Asian Games.

Yoon won her first ever Fencing World Cup medal in October 2015, at the Orléans competition. She was joint bronze medalist with Ibtihaj Muhammad. At the 2016 Summer Olympics, she only participated in the team event but they failed to win a medal after losing to Ukraine at the first stage. She won her first World Championships medal when they won silver in the team event at the 2017 World Championships.

Medal Record

Olympic Games

World Championship

Asian Championship

Grand Prix

World Cup

Personal life
Yoon attended Dong-Eui University, one of the few universities with a fencing team, and was contemporaries with fellow sabre fencer Kim Jun-ho. She is enrolled as a graduate student at Kookmin University, studying sports psychology.

References

External links

1993 births
Living people
South Korean female sabre fencers
Fencers at the 2016 Summer Olympics
Olympic fencers of South Korea
Fencers at the 2014 Asian Games
Fencers at the 2018 Asian Games
Asian Games gold medalists for South Korea
Asian Games medalists in fencing
Medalists at the 2014 Asian Games
Medalists at the 2018 Asian Games
Sportspeople from Busan
World Fencing Championships medalists
Fencers at the 2020 Summer Olympics
Medalists at the 2020 Summer Olympics
Olympic medalists in fencing
Olympic bronze medalists for South Korea
Kookmin University alumni
Dong-Eui University alumni
20th-century South Korean women
21st-century South Korean women